The Jefferson Davis Presidential Library and Museum is the presidential library of Jefferson Davis, President of the Confederate States from 1861 to 1865. Designed by Larry Albert of Albert & Associates Architects, the library is located within the Beauvoir historical site in Biloxi, Mississippi, United States.

Facilities 

The presidential library has the stated purpose of preserving, housing and making available the official papers, records, artifacts and other historical materials of Jefferson Davis. Despite the name, it is not administered by the National Archives and Records Administration, as Jefferson Davis was never president of the United States. It is, however, supported by the State of Mississippi, as is described on a plaque at the library entrance. The library is managed by the Mississippi Division, S.C.V., and features continually changing temporary exhibits and a permanent exhibit covering Jefferson Davis's life.

On August 29, 2005, the first Jefferson Davis presidential library suffered heavy damage from the fierce wind and water of Hurricane Katrina. The library pavilion, the Hayes Cottage, the Soldiers Home barracks replica, the Confederate Soldiers Museum, the gift shop, and director's home were totally destroyed. Artifacts were photographed, inventoried, boxed and placed in environmental storage while conservation of the items and Beauvoir Historic Site were under way. On January 9, 2007, a bid of $4.1 million was taken to rebuild the library and museum. Because of hurricane damage, renovation of the original Jefferson Davis presidential library was deemed impossible; consequently, the newly rebuilt library was rededicated and opened to the public on June 3, 2013. The Federal Emergency Management Agency paid $4 million to repair Beauvoir and an additional $10 million to construct the new library. The William Beckwith statue of Davis that once graced the rotunda of the library now stands near the entrance, along with a statue by Gary Casteel that was added in 2009.

See also 
 List of memorials to Jefferson Davis

References

External links 

 Official
 
 General information
 The Jefferson Davis Estate Papers at the Mississippi Department of Archives and History
 The Papers of Jefferson Davis at Rice University

1998 establishments in Mississippi
Davis, Jefferson
Buildings and structures in Biloxi, Mississippi
Confederate States of America monuments and memorials in Mississippi
Library buildings completed in 2013
Libraries in Mississippi
Presidential Library
Museums in Harrison County, Mississippi
Davis, Jefferson
Sons of Confederate Veterans